Mitrea is a Romanian surname. Notable people with this name include:
Bogdan Mitrea (born 1987), Romanian footballer
Dorina Mitrea (born 1965), Romanian-American mathematician
Ionuț Mitrea (born 1990), Romanian canoeist
Irina Mitrea, Romanian-American mathematician
Marius Mitrea (born 1982), Romanian rugby union referee
Miron Mitrea (born 1956), Romanian engineer and politician

Romanian-language surnames